HMS Redstart was one of three Royal Navy Linnet-class minelayers built in 1938. Assigned to the Royal Navy's China Station at the outbreak of World War II, she was scuttled during the Battle of Hong Kong on 19 December 1941  to prevent capture by the invading Japanese. Following the scuttling, its commander, Lt Cdr Henry Charles Sylvester Collingwood-Selby, participated in the defence of the colony where he was later wounded and captured, spending the rest of the war as a POW.

References
 Jane's Fighting Ships 1939, p. 98

External links
 HMS Redstart (M 62) at uboat.net

Linnet-class minelayers
Ships built in Leith
1938 ships
World War II minelayers of the United Kingdom